Paulette may refer to:

Paulette (name), French feminine given name
Paulette (tax)
 Paulette Caveat - a caveat filed in 1973 by a group of Dene chiefs  at the land titles office in Yellowknife, Northwest Territories to gain a legal interest in 400,000 square miles of land in northern Canada
Paulette (comics) (1971) by Georges Wolinski
Paulette (film), a 2012 film
DJ Paulette, Manchester born DJ famous for Flesh Club Nights Hacienda Manchester, UK